No Lost Cause is an American Christian punk and Christian ska band, and they primarily play punk rock, pop punk, ska, skate punk, and ska-punk. The band is from Toms River, New Jersey and was started in 2010 by vocalist and guitarist, Rob Jensen. The current lineup consists of Rob Jensen and Nick Povilonis. The band's first release, with Thumper Punk Records, NLC, an extended play, released in 2013, followed by the "Fight EP" in 2015.

Background
No Lost Cause is a Christian punk and Christian ska band from Winter Garden, FL. The band members are vocalist and guitarist, Rob Jensen and drummer, Nick Povilonis.

Music history
The band commenced as a musical entity in 2010, with their first release, N.L.C., an extended play, that was released on May 22, 2013, by Thumper Punk Records. Their second extended play, Fight, was released on August 19, 2015, from Thumper Punk Records.

Members
Current members
 Rob Jensen -  vocals, guitar
 Nick Povilonis – drums

Discography
EPs
 N.L.C. (May 22, 2013, Thumper Punk)
 Fight (August 19, 2015, Thumper Punk)
 In Stereo (split ep with Peter118, released September 4, 2017, Thumper Punk)

References

External links
Official website

Musical groups from New Jersey
2010 establishments in New Jersey
Musical groups established in 2010